José Miguel Medina Dávalos (born 19 May 1991 in Lagos de Moreno, Jalisco) is a Mexican professional footballer who plays for Oaxaca of Ascenso MX.

External links
Ascenso MX 

Liga MX players
Mexican footballers
People from Lagos de Moreno, Jalisco
Footballers from Jalisco
Association footballers not categorized by position
1991 births
Living people